The Weierstrass–Erdmann condition is a mathematical result from the calculus of variations, which specifies sufficient conditions for broken extremals (that is, an extremal which is constrained to be smooth except at a finite number of "corners").

Conditions 

The Weierstrass-Erdmann corner conditions stipulate that a broken extremal  of a functional  satisfies the following two continuity relations at each corner :

Applications 

The condition allows one to prove that a corner exists along a given extremal. As a result, there are many applications to differential geometry. In calculations of the Weierstrass E-Function, it is often helpful to find where corners exist along the curves. Similarly, the condition allows for one to find a minimizing curve for a given integral.

References 

Calculus of variations